In African cities, bus rapid transit is a relatively new phenomenon. The first system was opened in 2008 in Lagos, Nigeria and since then, many more BRT systems have been undertaken and are in different stages of development. 2016 saw a record three new BRTs on the continent. Ousmane Thiam, Honorary President of the International Association of Public Transport and President of CETUD, the urban transport authority in Dakar (Senegal), reckons there will be a significant development of BRT in Africa over the next years.

Currently BRT systems are in operation in the following African cities:

 Lagos (Nigeria): Lagos BRT, opened in March 2008
 Johannesburg (South Africa): Rea Vaya, opened in August 2009
 Cape Town (South Africa): MyCiTi, opened in May 2011
 Pretoria (South Africa): Areyeng, opened in December 2014
 George (South Africa): Go George BRT system, opened in August 2015
 Dar es Salaam (Tanzania): UDART, opened in May 2016
 Marrakech (Morocco), opened in November 2016
 Accra (Ghana), opened in November 2016
 Rustenburg (South Africa): Yarona, opened in September 2022

Often BRT is advocated as a cheaper way to build rapid mass transit for Africa's larger cities compared to rail. Implementing these systems is also sometimes conceptualized as a way to initiate wider reform of local bus systems often consisting of privately operated and flexibly run minibuses, sometimes called paratransit or "informal" transport. This also means that these projects confront the problem of how to integrate with these systems and address concerns of replacement or displacement from actors that own and operate minibus systems leading to clashes and raising significant political challenges in implementation.

References

2008 establishments in Nigeria
 
Transport in Africa